Secretos (Secrets) is 19th studio album recorded by Mexican performer José José, It was released by RCA Ariola in 1983 (see 1983 in music). It was written, produced and arranged by Manuel Alejandro. Secretos became the first collaboration of José José with Manuel Alejandro in a complete album, and became the most popular of Jose José's career. In the first weeks of its release it sold 2 million copies. and to date it has 20 million copies worldwide, which makes it one of the best-selling albums in the world. It holds the record for the best-selling album in the history of Mexico with 5 million copies. The Prince of the Song placed secrets for more than 40 weeks on the billboard popularity list in almost all the countries of the American continent. This album was so successful that its popularity in the world had increased brutally.  . Secretos received 22 Platinum and Gold certifications worldwide. Secretos was nominated for Grammy Awards for Best Latin Pop Performance in the 27th Annual Grammy Awards in 1985, losing to Always in My Heart (Siempre en mi Corazón) by Plácido Domingo.

Track listing

Secretos tracks sampled by other artists
"Lo Dudo"

In 1998 - U.S. rapper DMX sampled the intro of romantic ballad "Lo Dudo" in his song "Let Me Fly" of which was included in his debut release It's Dark and Hell Is Hot.

In 2005 - Los Angeles Latin Hip-Hop duo Akwid sample the same intro yet this time with vocal audio from the original recording of which was included on their album 'Los Aguacates De Jilquilpan' on the song "Anda Y Ve, Lo Dudo".

"Cuando Vayas Conmigo"

In 1998 - New York rapper Noreaga samples the intro of this romantic ballad in his titled song "It's Not a Game".

References

1983 albums
José José albums
RCA Records albums
Spanish-language albums
Albums produced by Manuel Alejandro